The Epistle to the Galatians is the ninth book of the New Testament. It is a letter from Paul the Apostle to a number of Early Christian communities in Galatia. Scholars have suggested that this is either the Roman province of Galatia in southern Anatolia, or a large region defined by Galatians, an ethnic group of Celtic people in central Anatolia.

The language the letter was originally written in was Koine Greek and later translated into other languages.

In this letter, Paul is principally concerned with the controversy surrounding Gentile Christians and the Mosaic Law during the Apostolic Age. Paul argues that the Gentile Galatians do not need to adhere to the tenets of the Mosaic Law, particularly religious male circumcision, by contextualizing the role of the law in light of the revelation of Christ. The Epistle to the Galatians has exerted enormous influence on the history of Christianity, the development of Christian theology, and the study of the Apostle Paul.

The central dispute in the letter concerns the question of how Gentiles could convert to Christianity, which shows that this letter was written at a very early stage in church history, when the vast majority of Christians were Jewish or Jewish proselytes, which historians refer to as the Jewish Christians.  Another indicator that the letter is early is that there is no hint in the letter of a developed organization within the Christian community at large.  This puts it during the lifetime of Paul himself.

Background 
As with all the Bible, the original of the letter (autograph) is not known to survive. Papyrus 46, the earliest reasonably complete version available to scholars today, dates to approximately AD 200, around 150 years after the original was presumably drafted. This papyrus is fragmented in a few areas, causing some of the original text to be missing; "however, through careful research relating to paper construction, handwriting development, and the established principles of textual criticism, scholars can be rather certain about where these errors and changes appeared and what the original text probably said."

Authorship and date

Authorship 

In the past, a small number of scholars have questioned Paul's authorship of Galatians, such as Bruno Bauer, Abraham Loman, C. H. Weisse, and Frank R. McGuire. Currently, biblical scholars agree that Galatians is a true example of Paul's writing. The main arguments in favor of the authenticity of Galatians include its style and themes, which are common to the core letters of the Pauline corpus. George S. Duncan described the authenticity of Paul as its author as "unquestioned ... In every line it betrays its origin as a genuine letter of Paul." Moreover, Paul's possible description of the Council of Jerusalem gives a different point of view from the description in Acts 15:2–29, if it is, in fact, describing the Jerusalem Council.

Date 

Jon Jordan notes that an interesting point to be made in the search for the dating of Galatians concerns whether or not it is a response to the Council of Jerusalem or a factor leading up to the Council. He writes, "did Paul's argument in Galatians flow out of the Jerusalem Council's decision, or did it come before the Jerusalem Council and possibly help shape that very decision?" It would have been enormously helpful to Paul's argument if he could have mentioned the decision of the Council of Jerusalem that Gentiles should not be circumcised. The absence of this argument from Paul strongly implies Galatians was written prior to the council. Since the council took place in 48-49 AD, and Paul evangelized South Galatia in 47-48 AD, the most plausible date for the writing of Galatians is 48 AD.

Audience 
Paul's letter is addressed "to the churches of Galatia", but the location of these churches is a matter of debate. Most scholars agree that it is a geographical reference to the Roman province in central Asia Minor, which had been settled by immigrant Celts in the 270s BC and retained Gaulish features of culture and language in Paul's day. Acts records Paul traveling to the "region of Galatia and Phrygia", which lies immediately west of Galatia. Some scholars have argued that "Galatia" is an ethnic reference to Galatians, a Celtic people living in northern Asia Minor.

The New Testament indicates that Paul spent time personally in the cities of Galatia (Antioch of Pisidia, Iconium, Lystra and Derbe) during his missionary journeys. They seem to have been composed mainly of Gentile converts. After Paul's departure, the churches were led astray from Paul's trust/faith-centered teachings by individuals proposing "another gospel" (which centered on salvation through the Mosaic Law, so-called legalism), whom Paul saw as preaching a "different gospel" from what Paul had taught. The Galatians appear to have been receptive to the teaching of these newcomers, and the epistle is Paul's response to what he sees as their willingness to turn from his teaching.

The identity of these "opponents" is disputed. However, the majority of modern scholars view them as Jewish Christians, who taught that in order for converts to belong to the People of God, they must be subject to some or all of the Jewish Law (i.e. Judaizers). The letter indicates controversy concerning circumcision, Sabbath observance, and the Mosaic Covenant. It would appear, from Paul's response, that they cited the example of Abraham, who was circumcised as a mark of receiving the covenant blessings. They certainly appear to have questioned Paul's authority as an apostle, perhaps appealing to the greater authority of the Jerusalem church governed by James (brother of Jesus).

North Galatian view
The North Galatian view holds that the epistle was written very soon after Paul's second visit to Galatia. In this view, the visit to Jerusalem, mentioned in Galatians 2:1–10, is identical with that of Acts 15, which is spoken of as a thing of the past. Consequently, the epistle seems to have been written after the Council of Jerusalem.  The similarity between this epistle and the epistle to the Romans has led to the conclusion that they were both written at roughly the same time, during Paul's stay in Macedonia in roughly 56–57.

This third date takes the word "quickly" in  literally. John P. Meier suggests that Galatians was "written in the middle or late 50s, only a few years after the Antiochene incident he narrates". Eminent biblical scholar Helmut Koester also subscribes to the "North Galatian Hypothesis". Koester points out that the cities of Galatia in the north consist of Ankyra, Pessinus, and Gordium (of the Gordian Knot fame of Alexander the Great).

South Galatian view
The South Galatian view holds that Paul wrote Galatians before the First Jerusalem Council, probably on his way to it, and that it was written to churches he had presumably planted during either his time in Tarsus (he would have traveled a short distance, since Tarsus is in Cilicia) after his first visit to Jerusalem as a Christian, or during his first missionary journey, when he traveled throughout southern Galatia. If it was written to the believers in South Galatia, it would likely have been written in 49.

Earliest epistle
A third theory is that Galatians 2:1–10 describes Paul and Barnabas' visit to Jerusalem described in Acts 11:30 and 12:25. This theory holds that the epistle was written before the Council was convened, possibly making it the earliest of Paul's epistles. According to this theory, the revelation mentioned (Gal. 2:2) corresponds with the prophecy of Agabus (Acts 11:27–28). This view holds that the private speaking about the gospel shared among the Gentiles precludes the Acts 15 visit, but fits perfectly with Acts 11. It further holds that continuing to remember the poor (Gal. 2:10) fits with the purpose of the Acts 11 visit, but not Acts 15.

In addition, the exclusion of any mention of the letter of Acts 15 is seen to indicate that such a letter did not yet exist, since Paul would have been likely to use it against the legalism confronted in Galatians. Finally, this view doubts Paul's confrontation of Peter (Gal. 2:11) would have been necessary after the events described in Acts 15. If this view is correct, the epistle should be dated somewhere around 47, depending on other difficult to date events, such as Paul's conversion.

Kirsopp Lake found this view less likely and wondered why it would be necessary for the Jerusalem Council (Acts 15) to take place at all if the issue were settled in Acts 11:30/12:25, as this view holds. Defenders of the view do not think it unlikely an issue of such magnitude would need to be discussed more than once. Renowned New Testament scholar J.B. Lightfoot also objected to this view since it "clearly implies that his [Paul's] Apostolic office and labours were well known and recognized before this conference."

Defenders of this view, such as Ronald Fung, disagree with both parts of Lightfoot's statement, insisting Paul received his "Apostolic Office" at his conversion (Gal. 1:15–17; Acts 9). Fung holds, then, that Paul's apostolic mission began almost immediately in Damascus (Acts 9:20). While accepting that Paul's apostolic anointing was likely only recognized by the Apostles in Jerusalem during the events described in Galatians 2/Acts 11:30, Fung does not see this as a problem for this theory.

Paul's opponents 
Scholars have debated whether we can or should attempt to reconstruct both the backgrounds and arguments of the opponents to which Paul would have been responding. Though these opponents have traditionally been designated as Judaizers, this classification has fallen out of favor in contemporary scholarship. Some instead refer to them as Agitators. While many scholars have claimed that Paul's opponents were circumcisionist Jewish followers of Jesus, the ability to make such determinations with a reasonable degree of certainty has been called into question. It has often been presumed that they traveled from Jerusalem, but some commentators have raised the question of whether they may have actually been insiders familiar with the dynamics of the community. Furthermore, some commentaries and articles pointed out the inherent problems in mirror-reading, emphasizing that we simply do not have the evidence necessary to reconstruct the arguments of Paul's opponents. It is not sufficient to simply reverse his denials and assertions. This does not result in a coherent argument nor can it possibly reflect the thought processes of his opponents accurately. It is nearly impossible to reconstruct the opponents from Paul's text because their representation is necessarily polemical.  All we can say with certainty is that they supported a different position of Gentile relations with Jewish folk than Paul did.

Outline

Introduction: The Cross and the Preeminence of the Gospel (1:1–10) 
 Prescript (1:1–5)
 Rebuke: The Occasion of the Letter (1:6–10)

The Truth of the Gospel (1:11–2:21) 
 How Paul Received and Defended the Gospel: Paul and the "Pillars" (1:11–2:14)
 The Truth of the Gospel Defined (2:15–21)

The Defense of the Gospel (3:1–5:12) 
 Rebuke and Reminder: Faith, Spirit, and Righteousness (3:1–6)
 Argument: Abraham's Children through Incorporation into Christ by Faith (3:7–4:7)
 Appeal (4:8–31)
 Exhortation and Warning: Faith, Spirit, and Righteousness (5:1–12)

The Life of the Gospel (5:13–6:10) 
 The Basic Pattern of the New Life: Serving One Another in Love (5:13–15)
 Implementing the New Life: Walking by the Spirit (5:16–24)
 Some Specific Parameters of the New Life (5:25–6:6)
 The Urgency of Living the New Life (6:7–10)

Closing: Cross and New Creation (6:11–18) 
This outline is provided by Douglas J. Moo.

Contents

This epistle addresses the question of whether the Gentiles in Galatia were obligated to follow Mosaic Law to be part of the Christ community. After an introductory address, the apostle discusses the subjects which had occasioned the epistle.

In the first two chapters, Paul discusses his life before Christ and his early ministry, including interactions with other apostles in Jerusalem. This is the most extended discussion of Paul's past that we find in the Pauline letters (cf. Philippians 3:1–7). Some have read this autobiographical narrative as Paul's defense of his apostolic authority. Others, however, see Paul's telling of the narrative as making an argument to the Galatians about the nature of the gospel and the Galatians' own situation.

Chapter 3 exhorts the Galatian believers to stand fast in the faith as it is in Jesus. Paul engages in an exegetical argument, drawing upon the figure of Abraham and the priority of his faith to the covenant of circumcision. Paul explains that the law was introduced as a temporary measure, one that is no longer efficacious now that the seed of Abraham, Christ, has come. Chapter 4 then concludes with a summary of the topics discussed and with the benediction, followed by 5:1–6:10 teaching about the right use of their Christian freedom.

In the conclusion of the epistle, Paul wrote, "See with what large letters I am writing to you with my own hand." (Galatians 6:11, ESV) Regarding this conclusion, Lightfoot, in his Commentary on the epistle, says:

Some commentators have postulated that Paul's large letters are owed to his poor eyesight, his deformed hands, or to other physical, mental, or psychological afflictions. Other commentators have attributed Paul's large letters to his poor education, his attempt to assert his authority, or his effort to emphasize his final words. Classics scholar Steve Reece has compared similar autographic subscriptions in thousands of Greek, Roman, and Jewish letters of this period and observes that large letters are a normal feature when senders of letters, regardless of their education, take the pen from their amanuensis and add a few words of greeting in their own hands.

Galatians also contains a catalogue of vices and virtues, a popular formulation of ancient Christian ethics.

Probably the most famous single statement made in the Epistle, by Paul, is in chapter 3, verse 28: "There is neither Jew nor Gentile, neither slave nor free, nor is there male and female, for you are all one in Christ Jesus." The debate surrounding that verse is legend and the two schools of thought are (1) this only applies to the spiritual standing of people in the eyes of God, it does not implicate social distinctions and gender roles on earth; and (2) this is not just about our spiritual standing but is also about how we relate to each other and treat each other in the here and now.

Position (1) emphasises the immediate context of the verse and notes that it is embedded in a discussion about justification: our relationship with God. Position (2) reminds its critics that the "whole letter context" is very much about how people got on in the here and now together, and in fact the discussion about justification came out of an actual example of people treating other people differently (2:11ff).

Major issues

Paul and the law 
Much variety exists in discussions of Paul's view of the Law in Galatians. Nicole Chibici-Revneanu noticed a difference in Paul's treatment of the Law in Galatians and Romans. In Galatians the law is described as the "oppressor" whereas in Romans Paul describes that the Law was as being just as much in need of the Spirit to set it free from sin as humans do. Peter Oakes argues that Galatians cannot be construed as depicting the law positively because the Law played the role it was meant to play in the scope of human history.  Wolfgang Reinbold argues that, contrary to the popular reading of Paul, the Law was possible to keep.

Under law and works of law 
Regarding "under the law" (Gal. 3:23; 4:4, 5, 21; 5:18), Todd Wilson argues that "under the law" in Galatians was a "rhetorical abbreviation for 'under the curse of the law. Regarding "works of the law" (Gal. 2:16), Robert Keith Rapa argues Paul is speaking of viewing Torah-observances as the means of salvation which he is seeking to combat in the Galatian congregation. Jacqueline de Roo noticed a similar phrase in the works found at Qumran and argues that "works of the law" is speaking of obedience to the Torah acting as a way of being atoned for. Michael Bachmann argues that this phrase is a mention of certain actions taken by Jewish people to distinguish themselves and perpetuate separation between themselves and Gentiles.

Law of Christ 
Much debate surrounds what Paul means by "law of Christ" in Galatians 6:2, a phrase that occurs only once in all of Paul's letters. As Schreiner explains, some scholars think that the "law of Christ" is the sum of Jesus's words, functioning as a "new Torah for believers". Others argue that the "genitive in the 'law of Christ' 'should be understood as explanatory, i.e. the law which is Christ. Some focus on the relationship between the law of Christ and the Old Testament Decalogue. Still other scholars argue that whereas the "Mosaic law is abolished", the new "law of Christ fits with the Zion Torah", which "hails from Zion ... and is eschatological". Schreiner himself believes that the law of Christ is equivalent to Galatians 5:13–14's "law of love".  According to Schreiner, when believers love others, "they behave as Christ did and fulfill his law".

Antioch incident 
As Thomas Schreiner explains, there is significant debate over the meaning of Peter's eating with the Gentiles—specifically, why might the eating have been considered wrong? E. P. Sanders argues that though Jews could eat in the same location with Gentiles, Jews did not want to consume food from the same vessels used by Gentiles. As Sanders explains, Galatia's Jews and Gentiles might have had to share the same cup and loaf (i.e. food from the same vessels). Other scholars such as James Dunn argue that Cephas was "already observing the basic food laws of the Torah" and then "men from James advocated an even stricter observance". Schreiner himself argues that Peter "actually ate unclean food—food prohibited by the OT law—before the men from James came". Depending on how one construes "eating with the Gentiles" in Galatians 2:12, one may reach different conclusions as to why Paul was so angry with Peter in Antioch.

There is debate about the meaning of the phrase  in Galatians 2:16. Grammatically, this phrase can be interpreted either as an objective genitive "through faith in Jesus Christ" or as a subjective genitive "through the faith of Jesus Christ".  There are theological ramifications to each position, but given the corpus of the Pauline literature, the majority of scholars have treated as an objective genitive, translating it as "faith in Jesus Christ". Daniel Harrington writes, "the subjective genitive does not oppose or do away with the concept of faith in Christ. Rather, it reestablishes priorities. One is justified by the faith of Jesus Christ manifested in his obedience to God by his death upon the cross. It is on the basis of that faith that one believes in Christ".

Sexuality and gender 
Galatians 3:28 says, "There is no longer Jew or Greek, there is no longer slave or free, there is no longer male and female; for all of you are one in Christ Jesus." According to Norbert Baumert, Galatians 3:28 is Paul's declaration that one can be in relationship with Jesus no matter their gender. Judith Gundry-Volf argues for a more general approach, stating that one's gender does not provide any benefit or burden. Pamela Eisenbaum argues that Paul was exhorting his readers to be mindful in changing conduct in relationships that involved people of different status. Ben Witherington argues that Paul is combatting the position espoused by opponents who were attempting to influence Paul's community to return to the patriarchal standards held by the majority culture.

There are two different interpretations within the modern scholarship regarding the meaning and function of Paul's statement that "there is no longer male and female". The first interpretation states that Paul's words eliminate the biological differences between males and females and thus calls gender roles into question. Nancy Bedford says that this does not mean that there is no distinction between males and females; instead, it means that there is no room for gender hierarchy in the gospel. The second interpretation states that one must recognize the historical background of Paul's time. Jeremy Punt argues that although many scholars want to say that this verse signifies changing gender norms, it actually reflects on the patriarchal structure of Paul's time.  In Paul's time, females and males were considered one sex, and the female was understood to be the inferior version of the male. It is under this one sex understanding that Paul says that "there is no longer male and female", and it therefore does not show an abolition of the boundary between genders because that boundary did not exist in Paul's time. At the same time, the women in Paul's time would also not necessarily have heard an ideology of gender equality from the message of Galatians 3:28 because of their subordinated status in society at that time. Punt argues that in Galatians 3:28, Paul's intention was to fix social conflicts rather than to alter gender norms. By stating the importance of becoming one in Christ, Paul tries to give his society a new identity, which is the identity in Christ, and he believes that this will fix the social conflicts.

Meaning of "Israel of God" 
Many scholars debate the meaning of the phrase "Israel of God" in Galatians 6:16, wherein Paul wishes for "peace and mercy" to be "even upon the Israel of God".  As Schreiner explains, scholars debate whether "Israel of God" refers to ethnically Jewish believers "within the church of Jesus Christ", or to the church of Christ as a whole (Jewish and Gentiles all included).  Those who believe that "Israel of God" only refers to ethnically Jewish believers, argue that had Paul meant the entire church, he would use the word "mercy" before "peace", because Paul "sees peace as the petition for the church, while mercy is the request for unredeemed Jews". Other scholars, such as G. K. Beale, argue that the Old Testament backdrop of Galatians 6:16—e.g. a verse such as Isaiah 54:10 wherein God promises mercy and peace to Israel—suggests that "the Israel of God" refers to a portion of the new, eschatological Israel "composed of Jews and Gentiles". Schreiner himself is sympathetic to this view, believing that treating the "Israel of God" as the church of Christ fits with the whole of Galatians, since Galatians pronounces "believers in Christ" as "the true sons of Abraham".

Significance and reception

Luther's theology and antisemitism 
Luther's fundamental belief in justification by faith was formed in large part by his interpretation of Galatians. Masaki claims 

This development led to some schools of thought, such as Canadian religious historian Barrie Wilson who points out in How Jesus Became Christian, how Paul's Letter to the Galatians represents a sweeping rejection of Jewish Law (Torah). In so doing, Paul clearly takes his Christ movement out of the orbit of Judaism and into an entirely different milieu. Paul's stance constitutes a major contrast to the position of James, brother of Jesus, whose group in Jerusalem adhered to the observance of Torah.

Gender, sexuality, and modern scholarship 
Galatians 3:28 is one of the most controversial and influential verses in Galatians. There are three different pairs that Paul uses to elaborate his ideology. The first one is "Jew or Greek", the second one is "slave or free", and the third one is "male and female",  Paul states that in Jesus Christ there is no longer a distinction between them. However, the meaning of this verse is not expounded upon further by Paul. In modern politics, the debate about the meaning of Galatians 3:28 is significant, as it is used by different people and scholars in order to make normative claims about sexuality, gender, and even marriage. The ongoing nature of this debate reveals that scholars still have not come to a unified conclusion regarding Paul's theology.

See also
 Paul the Apostle and Judaism
 Prayer of St. John Gabriel Perboyre to Jesus
 Textual variants in the Epistle to the Galatians

Explanatory notes

Citations

Cited works 
 .
 .
 .

External links

Online translations of the Epistle to Galatians:
 Bible Gateway 35 languages/50 versions at GospelCom.net
 Unbound Bible 100+ languages/versions at Biola University
 Galatians – King James Bible
 Online Bible at GospelHall.org
  Various versions

Related articles:
 A Brief Introduction to Galatians 
 Galatians, Paul, The Torah-Law & Legalism 
 John Chrysostom's Commentary on Galatians
 An alternative commentary on Galatians
 A Secular Site on Galatians
 Jewish messianic Commentary on Galatians (Jerusalem)
 

 
1st-century Christian texts
Galatians
Galatians